"Post Malone" is a song by Dutch DJ Sam Feldt featuring Dutch singer Rani. It was released on 24 May 2019 through Spinnin' Records as a single from Feldt's Magnets EP. The music video was directed by Deni Kukura and features drag queens Ma'maQueen, Abby Omg and Inga Shubskaya.

Lyrics
The song was referred to as an "ode" to American musician Post Malone and features the lines "Tonight, we go all night long / We party like Post Malone!".

Charts

Weekly charts

Year-end charts

Certifications

References

2019 singles
2019 songs
Sam Feldt songs
Rani (Dutch singer) songs
Songs about musicians
Songs written by Rani (Dutch singer)